Lotta Pauliina Henttala (née Lepistö; born 28 June 1989) is a Finnish racing cyclist, who currently rides for UCI Women's Continental Team . She has won the Finnish National Road Race Championships seven times, consecutively between 2012 and 2018.

Career
She competed in swimming and triathlon alongside cycling in her youth, before focusing on cycling after becoming Finnish Under-16 road racing champion. She competed in the 2013 UCI women's road race in Florence. She qualified to represent Finland at the 2020 Summer Olympics, but did not compete due to pregnancy. After not competing professionally during the 2022 season, Henttala will return to the professional peloton in 2023 with UCI Women's Continental Team .

Personal life
In October 2019, she married fellow professional cyclist Joonas Henttala, and their first child – a son – was born in January 2022.

Major results
Source: 

2008
 National Road Championships
2nd Road race
2nd Time trial
2009
 National Road Championships
2nd Time trial
4th Road race
 8th GP Stad Roeselare
2011
 5th Road race, National Road Championships
2012
 1st  Road race, National Road Championships
 1st Tour de Helsinki
2013
 National Road Championships
1st  Road race
2nd Time trial
 1st De Pinte
 1st Lebbeke
 1st Festival Cycliste Preizerdaul ITT
 5th Overall Naisten etappiajo
1st Stages 1 (ITT) & 5
2014
 National Road Championships
1st  Time trial
1st  Road race
 2nd Frauen Prolog Grand Prix Gippingen
 2nd Kriterium Meilen
 2nd Kriterium Riehen
 3rd Sparkassen Giro
 3rd GP Osterhas
 4th Trofee Maarten Wynants
 4th Para+Cycling
 6th Rund um Schönaich [LBS-Cup]
 8th GP Comune di Cornaredo
 9th Berner Rundfahrt
 10th SwissEver GP Cham-Hagendorn
2015
 National Road Championships
1st  Time trial
1st  Road race
 1st Points classification Auensteiner–Radsporttage
 3rd Berner Rundfahrt
 3rd GP Oberbaselbiet
 4th Grand Prix de Dottignies
 4th Frauen Grand Prix Gippingen
 4th Sparkassen Giro
 5th Tour of Chongming Island World Cup
 5th La Course by Le Tour de France
 7th Overall Thüringen Rundfahrt der Frauen
1st Stage 4
 9th Novilon Eurocup
2016
 National Road Championships
1st  Time trial
1st  Road race
 1st SwissEver GP Cham-Hagendorn
 1st Prologue Emakumeen Euskal Bira
 1st Stage 5 The Women's Tour
 2nd La Course by Le Tour de France
 Open de Suède Vårgårda
2nd Road race
2nd Team time trial
 UCI Road World Championships
3rd  Road race
3rd  Team time trial
 3rd Omloop van het Hageland
 3rd Chrono des Nations
 3rd Pajot Hills Classic
 8th Overall Festival Luxembourgeois du cyclisme féminin Elsy Jacobs
1st Stage 1
2017
 National Road Championships
1st  Time trial
1st  Road race
 1st Gent–Wevelgem
 Crescent Vårgårda
1st Road race
2nd Team time trial
 1st Dwars door Vlaanderen
 1st Stage 6 Giro Rosa
 2nd Prudential RideLondon Classique
 3rd  Team time trial, UCI Road World Championships
 4th Omloop van het Hageland
 5th Drentse Acht van Westerveld
 6th Overall Grand Prix Elsy Jacobs
 8th Road race, UEC European Road Championships
 8th Overall Healthy Ageing Tour
 8th Overall Ladies Tour of Norway
2018
 National Road Championships
1st  Time trial
1st  Road race
 1st Stage 5 The Women's Tour
 1st Prologue Giro della Toscana Int. Femminile – Memorial Michela Fanini
 Crescent Vårgårda
3rd Road race
3rd Team time trial
 4th Overall Festival Elsy Jacobs
 5th Prudential RideLondon Classique
 8th Amstel Gold Race
 10th Time trial, UEC European Road Championships
2019
 Setmana Ciclista Valenciana
1st Stages 2 & 4
 2nd Omloop van het Hageland
 4th Three Days of Bruges–De Panne
 7th Overall Healthy Ageing Tour
1st Stage 1
2020
 7th Omloop van het Hageland
 8th Race Torquay

References

External links

1989 births
Living people
Finnish female cyclists
People from Noormarkku
Cyclists at the 2016 Summer Olympics
Olympic cyclists of Finland
Sportspeople from Satakunta